Drumgath is a civil parish in County Down, Northern Ireland, southwest of Rathfriland. It is situated in the historic barony of Iveagh Upper, Upper Half. It is also a townland of 375 acres.

Settlements
The civil parish contains the following settlements:
Rathfriland

Townlands
The civil parish contains the following townlands:

Ballydoo
Ballykeel
Barnmeen
Carnany
Cross
Drumgath
Drumgreenagh
Drumlough
Kiltarriff
Lissize
Lurgancahone
Tullyquilly

See also
List of civil parishes of County Down

References